Tracy Lamont Moore (born December 28, 1965, in Oklahoma City, Oklahoma) is a retired American professional basketball player who played in the NBA. A 6'5" (1.96 m), 200 lb (91 kg) shooting guard, Moore played collegiately at the University of Tulsa. He was not drafted, but played with the Dallas Mavericks, Detroit Pistons, and the Houston Rockets from 1992 to 1997.

Moore's son plays football at Oklahoma State University.

References

External links
NBA statistics @ basketballreference.com
College profile @ tulsahurricane.cstv.com

1965 births
Living people
African-American basketball players
American men's basketball players
Basketball players from Oklahoma
Columbus Horizon players
Dallas Mavericks players
Detroit Pistons players
Fargo-Moorhead Fever players
Houston Rockets players
La Crosse Bobcats players
Pallacanestro Reggiana players
Pittsburgh Piranhas players
Quad City Thunder players
Shooting guards
Sportspeople from Oklahoma City
Tulsa Fast Breakers players
Tulsa Golden Hurricane men's basketball players
Tulsa Zone players
Undrafted National Basketball Association players
21st-century African-American people
20th-century African-American sportspeople